Giussano is a  (municipality) in the Province of Monza and Brianza in the Italian region Lombardy, located about  north of Milan.  
 
Giussano borders the following municipalities: Inverigo, Carugo, Arosio, Briosco, Mariano Comense, Carate Brianza, Verano Brianza, Seregno.

Giussano received the honorary title of city with a presidential decree on 22 October 1987.

See also 
Alberto da Giussano
Giussano-class cruiser

References

External links
  Official website